Sakina Karchaoui (born 26 January 1996) is a French professional footballer who plays as a left-back for Division 1 Féminine club Paris Saint-Germain and the France national team.

Early life
Born in Salon-de-Provence, in the Provence region of France, Karchaoui was raised in the nearby town of Miramas by her Moroccan parents. She began playing football in her neighborhood with boys. After two years at local club, US Miramas, she joined Montpellier.

Club career

Montpellier
Karchaoui earned her first cap for the senior Montpellier in November 2012 during a 6–0 win over Vendenheim. During the 2013–14 Division 1 Féminine season, Karchaoui made six appearances for the club, tallying a total of 475 minutes on the pitch. Montpellier finished in fourth place with a  record. The following season, she made 12 appearances with 9 starts. The club finished the 2014–15 season in fourth place with a  record. During the 2015–16 season, Karchaoui started in 19 of the 20 matches in which she appeared. In November 2015, she scored her first goal in a 4–0 win against Rodez. Montpellier finished in third place during the regular season with a  record.

Lyon
On 24 June 2020, fourteen-time defending league champions Lyon announced the signing of Karchaoui for 2020–21 season.

Paris Saint-Germain
On 10 July 2021, reigning league champions Paris Saint-Germain announced the signing of Karchaoui on a three-year deal.

International career
Karchaoui earned her first cap with the France national team in April 2016. She was later selected for the 2016 Rio Olympics. At the tournament, she started in the team's group-stage match against New Zealand resulting in a 3–0 win, and the quarter-final match against Canada where the team was eliminated in a 1–0 loss.

In March 2017, she helped France defeat the United States 3–0 to win the 2017 SheBelieves Cup for the first time.

Career statistics

Club

International

Honours
Montpellier
 Coupe de France runner-up: 2014–15, 2015–16

Lyon
 UEFA Women's Champions League: 2019–20

Paris Saint-Germain
 Coupe de France: 2021–22

France U20
 FIFA U-20 Women's World Cup runner-up: 2016

Individual
 UEFA Women's Championship Team of the Tournament: 2022
 Trophées UNFP du football Young Player of the Year:  2016–17
 Trophées UNFP du football Team of the Year: 2020–21, 2021–22
 IFFHS World Team: 2020
 Division 1 Féminine Player of the Month: December 2021

References

External links
 
 
 
 
 Montpellier player profile

Living people
1996 births
People from Salon-de-Provence
Sportspeople from Bouches-du-Rhône
French sportspeople of Moroccan descent
Women's association football defenders
French women's footballers
France women's youth international footballers
France women's international footballers
Division 1 Féminine players
Montpellier HSC (women) players
Olympique Lyonnais Féminin players
Paris Saint-Germain Féminine players
Footballers at the 2016 Summer Olympics
Olympic footballers of France
2019 FIFA Women's World Cup players
Footballers from Provence-Alpes-Côte d'Azur
UEFA Women's Euro 2022 players
UEFA Women's Euro 2017 players